William Randolph Steele (July 24, 1842 – November 30, 1901) was a Delegate from the Territory of Wyoming.

Born in New York City, Steele received an academic education.
He studied law.
He was admitted to the bar and practiced.
During the Civil War served in the Second Army Corps from 1861 to 1865.
He was discharged with the rank of captain and brevet lieutenant colonel.
He moved to the Territory of Wyoming in 1869 and engaged in the practice of law in Cheyenne.

Steele was elected as a member of the Territorial legislative council in 1871 and served until March 4, 1873, when he resigned, having been elected to Congress.

Steele was elected as a Democrat to the Forty-third and Forty-fourth Congresses (March 4, 1873 – March 3, 1877).
He was an unsuccessful candidate for reelection in 1876 to the Forty-fifth Congress.
He moved to Deadwood, South Dakota, and resumed the practice of law.
He served as mayor of Deadwood 1894-1896.
He died in Deadwood November 30, 1901.
He was interred in Mount Moriah Cemetery.

Sources

External links 
 
 

1842 births
1901 deaths
Politicians from New York City
Mayors of places in South Dakota
People of New York (state) in the American Civil War
Members of the Wyoming Territorial Legislature
Delegates to the United States House of Representatives from Wyoming Territory
Wyoming Democrats
Union Army officers
19th-century American politicians